Teviotville is a rural locality in the Scenic Rim Region, Queensland, Australia.

Geography
Teviotville is in the Scenic Rim of South East Queensland.

History
The name Teviotville is derived from the name of its railway station, which was named by the Queensland Railway Department in 1887, which in turn was named after the major watercourse in the area, Teviot Brook. The brook in turn was named on 6 August 1828 by explorer Allan Cunningham after the River Teviot in Roxburghshire, Scotland.

The Fassifern railway line (Queensland's first branch railway line) opened from Ipswich to Harrisville on 10 July 1882. On 12 September 1887 the line was extended to Dugundan with Teviotville being served by Teviotville railway station on Stanfield Road near the junction with Teviotville. The line closed in June 1964.

Teviotville Railway Station Provisional School opened on 1 August 1899 with 25 students under teacher Miss M.J.A. Alcorn. In 1903 it was renamed Teviotville Provisional School. On 1 January 1909 it became Teviotville State School. A new school building was opened on 13 March 1914 by Ernest Thomas Bell, the Member of the Queensland Legislative Assembly for Fassifern. It was on the south-west  corner of Hoya Road and Haag Road. It closed on 11 December 1981 due to low student numbers.

At the  the locality and surrounds recorded a population of 273.

Teviot Tree 
The Teviotville Tree is located on private property in Teviotville.  The tree was used in the filming of the 2010 film The Tree.

References

Further reading

External links

Scenic Rim Region
Localities in Queensland